Jeremiah Baisako (born 13 July 1980) is a Namibian footballer who played for the Namibia national football team, Baisako played domestically for United Africa Tigers, Ramblers F.C. and SK Windhoek. Previously, he played for United Africa Tigers.

References

1980 births
Living people
Namibian men's footballers
Namibia international footballers
2008 Africa Cup of Nations players
United Africa Tigers players
Ramblers F.C. players

Association football fullbacks
Namibia Premier League players
People from ǁKaras Region